Eduruleni Manishi is a 2001 Indian Telugu-language action drama film produced by D. Siva Prasad Reddy under the Kamakshi Movies banner and directed by Jonnalagadda Srinivasa Rao. It stars Nagarjuna Akkineni, Soundarya and Shenaz Treasurywala, with music composed by S.A. Rajkumar. It was dubbed into Hindi as Pandit Ek Yodha and into Tamil as Rudhiran.

Plot
Surya Murthy is the head of a village where he is highly respected by the entire village, except for the troublemaking Nazar. Surya Murthy stays with his grandfather and grandmother and a 6-year-old girl Rani. He has a younger look-alike brother Satyamurthy, aka Sathya in Hyderabad completing his engineering in computer science. Satya has a non-Telugu-speaking girlfriend Sri. Satya has a worrying factor now. His elder brother Surya Murthy has decided not to marry in his life. Hence, Satya starts looking for a suitable bride for his elder brother. There he meets Vasundhara at a temple and decides that she is the right choice for his elder brother. He approaches Vasundhara and asks her hand for marrying his elder brother. Later on, Vasundhara happens to observe the heroism and goodness in Surya Murthy when he comes to Hyderabad to meet Satya. Later on, Vasundhara learns that Surya Murthy and Satya are the younger brothers of the man who married her elder sister Bhavani. She tells Vasundhara that Surya Murthy played a villain role in their life and he was instrumental in her husband dying after prolonged boozing due to the compounding problems. She also tells that after her husband's demise, Surya Murthy forcibly took away her daughter Rani. After learning of her elder sister's flashback, Vasundhara decides to take revenge by marrying Surya Murthy and then slowly destroy the entire family. She accepts the proposal of Satya to marry his brother Surya Murthy. Then they start doing a drama by making Vasundhara stay in the village of Satya and creating situations where Vasundhara saves Rani from the perils. After the repetitive requests from his family members and Rani, Surya Murthy marries Vasundhara. The first step of Vasundhara after marriage was to postpone the first night by 22 days by bribing the priest. Then she transfers the money and jewelry to his sister's house with the help of a petty thief. But that thief runs away without giving jewelry to her sister and gets caught by the police. Meantime, Satya realizes the intentions of his sister-in-law Vasundhara and explains her the flashback of Rani and tells her that it was Bhavani who was a characterless lady. By the time Vasundhara realizes the fault in her, the thief was presented in the house of Surya Murthy and was interrogated as to who gave him jewelry. To save his sister-in-law, Satya behaves in a strange manner and tells Surya Murthy that he wants his partnership in the property. He says that he stole the jewelry and wants the thief to sell it so he can start his software business. With that incident, the brothers split. The rest of the film is about how the brothers get united and decimate the villain gang.

Cast

 Nagarjuna Akkineni as Surya Murthy and Satya (dual role)
 Soundarya as Vasundhara
 Shenaz Treasurywala as Srilekha / Sri
 Satyanarayana 
 Nassar 
 Kota Srinivasa Rao 
 Brahmanandam 
 Ali 
 Chandra Mohan 
 Venu Madhav
 L. B. Sriram 
 Satya Prakash
 Ponnambalam  
 Surya
 Gajar Khan 
 Ranganath 
 M.Balaiyah 
 Achyuth as Surya Murthy's brother and Satya's elder brother, Bhavani's husband
 Prasad Babu 
 Ananth 
 Gundu Hanumantha Rao 
 Gadiraju Subba Rao 
 Chandra Mouli 
 Vijaya Kumari 
 Sudha
 Yamuna as Bhavani
 Suhani Kalita as Rani
 Ruthika as Comedian #1

Soundtrack

Music composed by S. A. Rajkumar. Music released on ADITYA Music Company

References

2001 films
2001 action drama films
Indian action drama films
2000s Telugu-language films